The 100-Flat Building (The Stokvartirny House) is an eight-floor residential building in Novosibirsk, Russia, located at Krasny Prospekt, 16. It is a historical and cultural monument of federal significance in Russia. The building was created in 1934–1937 by prominent Russian architects Andrey Kryachkov and Vitaly Maslennikov.

History
The building was originally conceived as a high-profile residential complex for the Soviet elite and arranged for 100 well-appointed apartments (hence the name). The initial project included 10 five-bedroom suites, 30 four-bedroom suites, 40 three-bedroom flats, and 20 two-bedroom flats. The flats have a well-designed layout, large living and utility rooms; some suites had small rooms for maids.

Construction of the house began in 1934. The initial exterior design was substantially complicated in the process, for architect Maslennikov added facade elements themed after the works of French architect Auguste Perret.

At the Exposition Internationale des Arts et Techniques dans la Vie Moderne in Paris on December 11, 1937, the project, along with other works by Kryachkov, was awarded the 1st degree diploma, a gold medal, and a Grand Prix.

Currently, there are 110 apartments in the building, not 100. In 2008, a monument to Kryachkov was erected in front of the building.

Notable residents
In various years there lived Gersh Budker (physicist), Eugeny Meshalkin (cardiologist), Vladimir Mysh (surgeon), Alexander Tikhonov (biathlete), Yevgeny Mravinsky (conductor), Nikolai Cherkasov (actor), Nikolai Simonov (actor), Vasili Merkuryev (actor). Kryachkov himself, contrary to the popular opinion, never lived in the building.

Gallery

See also
 House of Socialist Agriculture
 Oblplan House
 Stanislavsky Street 7

References

External links
 Самый знаменитый дом Новосибирска празднует юбилей (in Russian)
 The panorama view of the building
 

Residential buildings completed in 1937
Stalinist architecture
Tsentralny City District, Novosibirsk
Buildings and structures in Novosibirsk
Buildings and structures built in the Soviet Union
Cultural heritage monuments of federal significance in Novosibirsk Oblast